The Mark 5 nuclear bomb and W5 nuclear warhead were a common core American nuclear weapon design, designed in the early 1950s and which saw service from 1952 to 1963.

Description
The Mark 5 design used a 92-point implosion system (see Nuclear weapon design) and a composite uranium/plutonium fissile material core or pit.

The Mark 5 and W5 were pure fission weapons. There were at least four basic models of core design used, and sub-variants with yields of 6, 16, 55, 60, 100, and 120 kilotons have been reported.

As with many early US nuclear weapon designs, the fissile material or pit could be kept separately from the bomb and assembled into it during flight. This technology is known as In Flight Insertion or IFI. The Mark 5 had an automatic IFI mechanism which could insert the pit into the center of the explosive assembly from a storage position in the bomb nose. The image here shows the doors to that nose compartment open.

History
The Mark 5 was in service from 1952 to 1963. The W5 saw service from 1954 to 1963. Approximately 72 Mark 5 weapons were supplied for delivery by RAF bombers but under US control, under the auspices of Project E.

A Mark 5 was used as the primary fission trigger used in Ivy Mike, the first thermonuclear device in history.

See also
 List of nuclear weapons
 Nuclear weapon design

References

Bibliography
 Leitch, Andy. "V-Force Arsenal: Weapons for the Valiant, Victor and Vulcan". Air Enthusiast No. 107, September/October 2003. pp. 52–59.

External links
 Allbombs.html list of all US nuclear warheads at nuclearweaponarchive.org

Mark 05
Nuclear bombs of the United States
Military equipment introduced in the 1950s